Vijin may refer to:

Vijin-e Bala
Vijin-e Pain